Swetland Homestead is a historic home located at Wyoming, Luzerne County, Pennsylvania. The original section was built in 1797, and subsequently expanded between 1803 and 1813. A four-columned portico was added in 1850.

The Swetland Homestead is now a historic house museum that is open by appointment with the Luzerne County Historical Society.

It was added to the National Register of Historic Places in 1978.

References

External links

Swetland Homestead - Luzerne County Historical Society

Houses on the National Register of Historic Places in Pennsylvania
Historic American Buildings Survey in Pennsylvania
Houses completed in 1813
Houses in Luzerne County, Pennsylvania
Museums in Luzerne County, Pennsylvania
Historic house museums in Pennsylvania
National Register of Historic Places in Luzerne County, Pennsylvania